Microgramma lycopodioides, also known by its common name clubmoss snakefern is a species from the genus Microgramma.

References

Polypodiaceae
Flora of Suriname